Olman Andrés Vargas López (born April 15, 1985) is a Costa Rican footballer who currently plays for La U Universitarios.

Club career
A tall striker, Vargas began his career with Ramonense, before moving to Carmelita where he scored 14 goals in 38 matches. While at Carmelita, Vargas was noticed by storied First Division club Deportivo Saprissa and joined the club for the 2009-10 season. He made 11 league appearances for Saprissa and netted 2 goals. He was then loaned to Brujas FC for the second half of the 2009-10 season. He appeared in 12 matches for Brujas only scoring 1 goal. In 2010, he was sent on loan to C.S. Herediano, and helped guide his new club into the 2010 Apertura playoffs and the final of the 2011 Apertura where it lost to Alajuelense in a penalty shootout. While with Herediano the striker netted 19 goals in 53 league appearances.

On January 6, 2012, Vargas was signed to a multi-year contract by Columbus Crew of Major League Soccer.

On March 24, 2012, Vargas scored his first goal in the MLS, a header coming of a cross from left back Shaun Francis.

On November 20, 2012, Vargas was released by the Columbus Crew. He signed with Herediano at the beginning of 2013, but left them for Universidad in summer 2014. In December 2014 he signed for Guatemalan side Antigua de Guatemala.

Ahead of the 2019/20 season, Vargas joined La U Universitarios.

International career
Vargas made his debut for Costa Rica in an April 2012 friendly match against Honduras in which he immediately scored. He won his second and final cap in a June 2012 FIFA World Cup qualification match against El Salvador.

International goals
Scores and results list Costa Rica's tally first.

Personal life
Vargas has been engaged to model Tasha Hines since September 2013.

References

External links
 
 Columbus Crew profile
 
 nacion statistics (Herediano)
 

1985 births
Living people
People from San José, Costa Rica
Association football forwards
Costa Rican footballers
Costa Rica international footballers
A.D. Ramonense players
A.D. Carmelita footballers
Deportivo Saprissa players
Brujas FC players
C.S. Herediano footballers
Columbus Crew players
C.F. Universidad de Costa Rica footballers
Costa Rican expatriate footballers
Expatriate soccer players in the United States
Major League Soccer players
Antigua GFC players